Thyrogonia is a genus of moth in the subfamily Arctiinae. It was erected in 1898.

Species
 Thyrogonia aurantiiventris Kiriakoff, 1953
 Thyrogonia cyaneotincta Hampson, 1918
 Thyrogonia efulensis Holland, 1898
 Thyrogonia hampsoni Kiriakoff, 1953

References

External links

Arctiinae